Larization is de-dollarization for Georgian currency – Lari. The term may have two meanings:

 Larization - percentage share of Lari in all currency usage. For example: loans (deposits) larization - percentage share of loans (deposits) disbursed (received) in Lari, in total amount of loans (deposits) disbursed (received) by commercial banks. Larization of economy - percentage share of Lari in total money supply of economy.
 Larization - a process when percentage of larization is increasing. This process may be triggered by Economic agents in a country who prefer national currency to foreign currency for transactions. They prefer to keep (of their own free will) their savings in national currency instead of foreign currency and also take loans (of their own free will) in national currency instead of foreign currency. They set prices on goods (including durable consumption goods: flat, car, etc.) in national currency instead of foreign currency.

Under the condition of increased larization, since 2016  Georgia has witnessed an increase in inflation, due to having an unnatural amount of money supply.

References

Foreign exchange market
Monetary policy
Economy of Georgia (country)